Cassidy House may refer to:

in the United States
(by state then city)
Cassidy House (Bridgeport, Connecticut), listed on the National Register of Historic Places (NRHP) in Fairfield County
James J. Cassidy House, Cleveland, New Mexico, listed on the NRHP in Mora County
Daniel Cassidy House, Mora, New Mexico, listed on the NRHP in Mora County
Cassidy House (Rapid City, South Dakota), listed on the NRHP in Pennington County
James Cassidy House, Park City, Utah, listed on the NRHP in Summit County
Cassidy Farmhouse, Barneveld, Wisconsin, listed on the NRHP in Iowa County